Apollonia van Veen (died 1635) was a Dutch pastellist.

Possibly born in the Hague, van Veen was the daughter of painter Pieter van Veen. Her brothers Symon and Jacobus were pastellists as well; all three were known to be portraitists. She died in Goes.

References

Year of birth unknown
1635 deaths
Dutch women painters
17th-century Dutch painters
17th-century women artists
Dutch portrait painters
Pastel artists